Forwarding may refer to:

Computing and technology 
 Call forwarding, a telephony feature that allows calls to one phone number to be forwarded to another number
 Remote call forwarding, a telephony feature that allows call forwarding to be activated remotely
 Cisco Express Forwarding, an advanced layer 3 switching technology used mainly on the enterprise core network or the Internet
 Mail forwarding, a service that redirects mail from one address to another
 Email forwarding, the re-sending of an email message onward to another email address
 Operand forwarding in an instruction pipeline
 Packet forwarding, the relaying of packets from one network segment to another by nodes in a computer network
 Forwarding equivalence class, a set of packets with similar or identical characteristics that may be forwarded the same way
 Port forwarding, the act of forwarding a network port from one network node to another
 Reverse-path forwarding, a technique used in routers for ensuring loop-free forwarding of packets in multicast routing and to help prevent IP address spoofing in unicast routing
 URL redirection, also called URL forwarding, domain redirection and domain forwarding, a technique that forwards web page visitors to another page

Other uses 
 Freight forwarding, a service by which a freight forwarder dispatches shipments via common carriers
 Timber forwarding, the transport of logs from the stump to the forest road
 Perfect forwarding, a feature of the programming language C++11
 Routing

See also 
 Routing (disambiguation)